In law, a minor is someone under a certain age, usually the age of majority, which demarcates an underage individual from legal adulthood. The age of majority depends upon jurisdiction and application, but it is commonly 18. Minor may also be used in contexts that are unconnected to the overall age of majority. For example, the smoking and drinking age in the United States is 21, and younger people below this age are sometimes called minors in the context of tobacco and alcohol law, even if they are at least 18. The terms underage or minor often refer to those under the age of majority, but may also refer to a person under other legal age limits, such as the age of consent, marriageable age, driving age, voting age, etc. Such age limits are often different from the age of majority. 

The concept of minor is not sharply defined in most jurisdictions. The age of criminal responsibility and consent, the age at which school attendance is no longer compulsory, the age at which legally binding contracts can be entered into, and so on may be different from one another.

In many countries, including Australia, Serbia, India, Brazil, Croatia, Colombia, and the UK a minor is defined as a person under the age of 18. In the United States, where the age of majority is set by individual states, "minor" usually refers to someone under 18 but can in some areas (such as alcohol, gambling, and handguns) mean under 21. In the criminal justice system a minor may be tried and punished either "as a juvenile" or "as an adult".

In Taiwan and Thailand, a minor is a person under 20 years of age, and, in South Korea, a person under 19 years of age. In New Zealand law, the age of majority is 20 years of age as well, but most of the rights of adulthood are assumed at lower ages: for example, entering contracts and having a will are allowed at 15, while the drinking and voting age are both at 18.

International

Canada

For all provincial laws (such as alcohol and tobacco regulation), the provincial and territorial governments have the power to set the age of majority in their respective province or territory, and the age varies across Canada.

Alberta, Manitoba, Ontario, Quebec, Saskatchewan, and Prince Edward Island have the age of majority set at 18, while in British Columbia, Yukon, Northwest Territories, Nunavut, Newfoundland, Nova Scotia, and New Brunswick the age of majority is 19. In the provinces of Saskatchewan, Ontario, New Brunswick, British Columbia, Nova Scotia, the legal gambling age and the legal drinking age are both 19, while in Alberta, Quebec, and Manitoba it is 18 which is the age of majority.

Under cannabis laws, a minor means anyone under 19 in the country except for Quebec which has a legal age of 21, and Alberta which is age 18.

Italy
In Italy, law nr. 39 of March 8, 1975, states that a minor is a person under the age of 18. Citizens under the age of 18 may not vote, be elected, obtain a driving license for automobiles or issue or sign legal instruments. Crimes committed in Italy by minors are tried in a juvenile court.

Mexico
In all 31 states, a minor is referred to as someone under the age of 18.

Minors aged 16 or 17 who are charged with crimes could sometimes be treated as an adult.

India
In all 28 states and 8 union territories, a minor is referred to as someone under the age of 18. In rare cases minors aged 16 or 17 who are charged with extremely heinous crimes could sometimes be treated as an adult.

Thailand
The Civil and Commercial Code of the Kingdom of Thailand does not define minor; however, sections 19 and 20 read as follows:
 Section 19 – A person, on completion of 20 years of age, ceases to be a minor and becomes sui juris.
 Section 20 – A minor becomes sui juris upon marriage, provided the marriage is made in accordance with the provisions of Section 1448.

Hence, a minor in Thailand refers to any person under the age of 20, unless they are married. A minor is restricted from doing juristic actsfor example, signing contracts. When minors wish to do a juristic act, they have to obtain the consent from their legal representative, usually (but not always) the parents and otherwise the act is voidable. The exceptions are acts by which a minor merely acquires a right or is freed from a duty, acts that are strictly personal, and acts that are suitable to the person's condition in life and are required for their reasonable needs. A minor can make a will at the age of fifteen.

United Kingdom

In England and Wales and in Northern Ireland a minor is a person under the age of 18;  in Scotland a minor reaches the age of majority at 18 although minors from the age of 16 have legal capacity to enter into contracts. The age of criminal responsibility in England and Wales and in Northern Ireland is 10; and 12 in Scotland, formerly 8, which was the lowest age in Europe.

In England and Wales, cases of minors breaking the law are often dealt with by the Youth Offending Team. If they are incarcerated, they are sent to a Young Offender Institution.

Things that persons under 18 are prohibited from doing include sitting on a jury, voting, standing as a candidate, buying or renting films with an 18 certificate or R18 certificate or seeing them in a cinema, being depicted in pornographic materials, suing without a litigant friend, being civilly liable, accessing adoption records and purchasing alcohol, tobacco products, knives and fireworks. The rules on minimum age for sale of these products are frequently broken so in practice drinking and smoking takes place before the age of majority; however many UK shops are tightening restrictions on them by asking for identifying documentation from potentially underage customers.

Driving certain large vehicles, acting as personal license holder for licensed premises, and adopting a child are permitted only upon the age of 21. The minimum age to drive a HGV1 vehicle was reduced to 18. However, certain vehicles, e.g., steamrollers, require that someone be 21 years of age to obtain an operating license.

United States
In the United States as of 1971, minor is generally legally defined as a person under the age of 18. However, in the context of alcohol or gambling laws, people under the age of 21 may also sometimes be referred to as minors. However, not all minors are considered juveniles in terms of criminal responsibility. As is frequently the case in the United States, the laws vary widely by state.

Under this distinction, those considered juveniles are usually (but not always) tried in juvenile court, and they may be afforded other special protections. For example, in some states a parent or guardian must be present during police questioning, or their names may be kept confidential when they are accused of a crime. For many crimes (especially more violent crimes), the age at which a minor may be tried as an adult is variable below the age of 18 or (less often) below 16.
The death penalty for those who have committed a crime while under the age of 18 was discontinued by the U.S. Supreme Court case Roper v. Simmons in 2005. The court's 5–4 decision was written by Justice Kennedy and joined by Justices Ginsburg, Stevens, Breyer, and Souter, and cited international law, child developmental science, and many other factors in reaching its conclusion.

The twenty-sixth amendment to the U.S. Constitution, ratified in 1971, granted all citizens the right to vote in every state, in every election, from the age of 18, reducing the minimum ages for most privileges that had previously been set at 21 (signing contracts, marrying without parental consent, termination of legal parental custody) to 18, with the exception of drinking, which had been raised to 21 around the 1980s due to teen drunk driving cases protested by the Mothers Against Drunk Driving.

The U.S. Department of Defense took the position that they would not consider "enemy combatants" held in extrajudicial detention in the Guantanamo Bay detainment camps minors unless they were less than sixteen years old. In any event, they separated only three of more than a dozen detainees under 16 from the adult prison population. Several dozen detainees between sixteen and eighteen were detained with the adult prison population. Now those under 18 are kept separate, in line with the age of majority and world expectations.

Some states, including Florida, have passed laws that allow a person accused of an extremely heinous crime, such as murder, to be tried as an adult, regardless of age. These laws have been challenged by the American Civil Liberties Union. An estimated 250,000 youth are tried, sentenced, or incarcerated as adults every year across the United States.

Emancipation of minors

Emancipation of minors is a legal mechanism by which a minor is no longer under the control of their parents or guardians, and is given the legal rights associated with adults. Depending on country, emancipation may happen in different manners: through marriage, attaining economic self-sufficiency, obtaining an educational degree or diploma, or participating in a form of military service. In the United States, all states have some form of emancipation of minors.

References

External links

Ageism
Childhood
Juvenile law